Jacob Andrew Barnes (born April 14, 1990) is an American professional baseball pitcher in the Texas Rangers organization. He previously played in Major League Baseball (MLB) for the Milwaukee Brewers, Kansas City Royals, Los Angeles Angels, New York Mets, Toronto Blue Jays, Detroit Tigers and New York Yankees. Barnes made his MLB debut in 2016.

Career

Amateur career
Barnes graduated from St. Petersburg High School. He enrolled at Florida Gulf Coast University and played college baseball for the Florida Gulf Coast Eagles. In 2011, his junior year, he had a 1–4 win-loss record with a 4.58 earned run average (ERA) in 55 innings pitched. He was drafted by the Milwaukee Brewers in the 14th round of the 2011 Major League Baseball draft and he signed.

Milwaukee Brewers
After signing, Barnes made his professional debut with the Helena Brewers where he was 2–1 with a 2.12 ERA in 29.2 relief innings pitched. In 2012, he played for the Wisconsin Timber Rattlers where he pitched to a 4–7 record and a 3.84 ERA in 25 games (seven starts), and in 2013, he pitched with the Brevard County Manatees where he was 9–6 with a 3.08 ERA in 21 games (14 starts). Barnes began 2014 with Brevard County, and after compiling a 1.23 ERA in 7.1 innings, he was promoted to the Huntsville Stars and he finished the season there with a 2–6 record and 4.26 ERA in 23 games (21 being starts). In 2015, he pitched for the Biloxi Shuckers where he compiled a 4–5 record and a 3.36 ERA in 39 games including six starts.

The Brewers added Barnes to their 40-man roster after the 2015 season. He began 2016 with the Colorado Springs Sky Sox.

After posting a 1.21 ERA over 17 games for the Sky Sox, the Brewers promoted Barnes to the major leagues on June 2, 2016. He made his major league debut the next day, and spent the remainder of the season with Milwaukee. In 26.2 innings pitched in relief, he was 0–1 with a 2.70 ERA. In 2017, Barnes returned to Milwaukee and posted a 3–4 record and a 4.00 ERA in 73 relief appearances in his first full major league season.

Barnes returned to Milwaukee's bullpen to begin 2018. However, after pitching to a 12.00 ERA in his first four outings in May, he was optioned to Colorado Springs on May 12. He was recalled on May 27.

On August 1, 2019, Barnes was designated for assignment after posting an ERA of 6.86 in  innings.

Kansas City Royals
On August 3, 2019, Barnes was claimed off waivers by the Kansas City Royals. Barnes was designated for assignment on November 4 and was released on November 6.

Los Angeles Angels
On January 22, 2020, Barnes signed a minor league deal with the Los Angeles Angels. On July 23, 2020, Barnes had his contract selected to the 40-man and active rosters. He pitched to a 5.50 ERA over 18 games for the Angels in 2020.

New York Mets
On October 30, 2020, Barnes was claimed off waivers by the New York Mets. In 19 appearances for the Mets, Barnes struggled to a 6.27 ERA in 18.2 innings of work before being designated for assignment on June 14, 2021.

Toronto Blue Jays
On June 19, 2021, Barnes was traded to the Toronto Blue Jays in exchange for Troy Miller. Barnes was designated for assignment by Toronto on July 26 after posting a 6.00 ERA in 9 appearances with the team. On August 2, Barnes was outrighted to the Triple-A Buffalo Bisons. On September 29, Barnes was re-selected to the 40-man roster. Barnes was again designated for assignment on October 20, and elected free agency two days later.

Detroit Tigers
On December 1, 2021, the Detroit Tigers signed Barnes to a minor league contract with an invitation to spring training. After initially being sent to minor league camp during spring training, Barnes was called back to the major league camp and made the opening day roster. On June 13, 2022, the Tigers designated Barnes for assignment.  He was released by the Tigers on June 18, 2022.

Seattle Mariners 
On June 22, 2022, the Seattle Mariners signed Barnes to a minor league contract. He was promoted to the major league roster on July 9. He was designated for assignment on July 11 without appearing in a game for Seattle. He cleared waivers and elected free agency on July 18.

Detroit Tigers (second stint) 
On July 26, 2022, the Detroit Tigers signed Barnes to a minor league contract. He was then assigned to the Toledo Mud Hens. He was given his release on August 26.

New York Yankees 
On August 31, 2022, the New York Yankees signed Barnes to a minor league contract. He pitched for the Scranton/Wilkes-Barre RailRiders. The Yankees promoted Barnes to the major leagues on October 1. He was designated for assignment the next day and outrighted back the RailRiders on October 4. On October 24, Barnes elected free agency.

Texas Rangers
On January 18, 2023, Barnes signed a minor league contract with the Texas Rangers organization.

References

External links

1990 births
Living people
Baseball players from St. Petersburg, Florida
Major League Baseball pitchers
Milwaukee Brewers players
Kansas City Royals players
Los Angeles Angels players
New York Mets players
Toronto Blue Jays players
Detroit Tigers players
New York Yankees players
Buffalo Bisons (minor league) players
Florida Gulf Coast Eagles baseball players
Helena Brewers players
Wisconsin Timber Rattlers players
Brevard County Manatees players
Huntsville Stars players
Criollos de Caguas players
Biloxi Shuckers players
Surprise Saguaros players
Colorado Springs Sky Sox players
San Antonio Missions players
Omaha Storm Chasers players
Tacoma Rainiers players
Liga de Béisbol Profesional Roberto Clemente pitchers